Carmen Alcayde Ballesteros (Valencia, 9 April 1973) is a Spanish TV presenter and actress.

Career

TV presenter
She made the career of journalism and started making reports in local stations of Valencia and Gandía. She was editor of the program Todo Madrid in 2002. On March 24, 2003, along with Jorge Javier Vázquez she began to present in Telecinco the program that would take her to stardom, Aquí hay tomate, focusing on gossip. The program lasted until 1 February 2008 with a lot of audience but criticism of sensationalism. She tried to repeat the success with another gossip program that year, Las gafas de Angelino, but it only lasted one month.

On 28 December 2008, she presented ¡Guaypaut!, the Spanish version of Wipeout as well as 10 editions of the Guinness World Récords (focusing on people who had won or tried to win a Guinness) in 2009. She also collaborated in debates of some reality shows of Telecinco (Gran Hermano, Supervivientes). In summer of 2011 she replaced Ana Rosa Quintana in her program.
2020 Colaboradora programa en Zapeando en la Sexta TV

Other
She made the cover of FHM magazine on Juny, 2005.

Personal life
Alcayde got married in 2003 and has two children: Carmen Lucía (born 2009) and Eduardo (born 2010).

Works

TV 
 2003–2008, Aquí hay tomate in Telecinco (TV presenter)
 2004, 7 vidas in Telecinco (Actress, 1 episode)
 2004–2005, Special New Year's Eve Telecinco (Presenter)
 2005–2007, 2009–2010 in Gran Hermano: El Debate (Collaboration)
 2008, Las gafas de Angelino en Telecinco (Presenter)
 2008–2009, ¡Guaypaut! in Telecinco (Presenter)
 2008–2009, Guinness World Records in Telecinco (Presenter)
 2009, Sexo en Chueca in LaSiete, Telecinco.es (Actriz)
 2009–2010, Escenas de matrimonio 2 in Telecinco (Actress)
 2010, Gran Hermano: El Reencuentro in Telecinco (Colaboradora)
 2010, Fresa ácida en Telecinco (Presenter)
 2010, Supervivientes: El Debate in Telecinco (Colaboradora)
 2011, El programa de Ana Rosa in Telecinco (Collaboration)
 2011, El Reencuentro: El Debate in Telecinco (Collaboration)
 2011, El programa del verano in Telecinco (Presenter)

Books 
 2005 Treintañeras.
 2009, Sobre Vivir en Pareja

References

1973 births
Living people
21st-century Spanish actresses
Spanish television presenters
Spanish women television presenters